Selby is an unincorporated community in Contra Costa County, in the East Bay region of the San Francisco Bay Area in northern California.

Geography
The town is located on the Carquinez Strait where its enters San Pablo Bay, across from Vallejo. The town at an elevation of 20 feet (6 m).

History
Selby is located on the 19th century Mexican land grant Rancho El Pinole site, that was made to Ygnacio Martinez.

A post office operated at Selby from 1886 to 1967. The name honors Prentiss Selby, its first postmaster.

Al Zampa, a bridge construction worker who played an integral role in the construction of numerous San Francisco Bay Area bridges, was born here in 1905. The suspension bridge unit of the twin Carquinez Bridge is officially called the Alfred Zampa Memorial Bridge, completed in 2003 to the east of town.

References

Unincorporated communities in California
Company towns in California
Carquinez Strait
San Pablo Bay
Populated places established in 1886
1886 establishments in California
Unincorporated communities in Contra Costa County, California
Populated coastal places in California